CREB regulated transcription coactivator (CRTC) may refer to the following proteins and genes:

CRTC1
CRTC2
CRTC3

See also
CREB
CRTC (disambiguation)